The F. E. J. Fry Medal is an annual award for zoology given by the Canadian Society of Zoologists.

It is presented to "the Canadian zoologist who has made an outstanding contribution to knowledge and understanding of an area in zoology". The recipient is expected to give a lecture to the next annual conference.

The award was established in 1974 in honour of Frederick E.J. Fry, the Canadian ichthyologist and aquatic ecologist, in recognition of his contribution to science in Canada.

Recipients
 Source

See also
 List of biologists
 List of biology awards
 List of awards named after people

References

Canadian science and technology awards
Awards established in 1974
Biology awards